Kim J. Gillan is a former Democratic Party member of the Montana Senate.  She represented District 24 from 2004 to 2012. She was unable to run for reelection in 2012 due to Montana's term limits. Earlier she was a member of the Montana House of Representatives from 1996 through 2004. On June 21, 2011, she announced that she would be a candidate for the U.S. House of Representatives for the open seat in Montana's At-large congressional district that was available in the 2012 election due to incumbent Denny Rehberg's decision to run against U.S. Senator Jon Tester. Gillan was defeated by Republican businessman Steve Daines in the November 2012 general election.

See also 
 Montana House of Representatives, District 11

References

External links
Montana Senate - Kim Gillan official MT State Legislature website
Project Vote Smart - Senator Kim J. Gillan (MT) profile
Follow the Money - Kim Gillan
2008 2006 2004 Senate campaign contributions
2002 2000 1998 1996 House campaign contributions

1951 births
Cornell University alumni
Living people
Democratic Party members of the Montana House of Representatives
Democratic Party Montana state senators
People from El Cerrito, California
Politicians from Billings, Montana
Women state legislators in Montana
University of California, Los Angeles alumni
21st-century American women